Relations between Mongolia and Japan began in the 13th century, but the two countries had no formal, diplomatic interactions until the late 20th century.

History

Mongol invasions

By 1259, Korean resistance to the Mongol invasion had collapsed. With Korea under Mongol control, the attempts by the Mongol Empire to invade the Japanese Archipelago began after the Goryeo Dynasty (now Korea) formed an alliance with Kublai Khan of the Mongols.

Kublai sent several emissaries, in 1268, demanding that the "king" of Japan submit to the Empire, under its mandate from Eternal Heaven.  
These emissaries were either ignored or rebuffed by Japan, and as a consequence in October 1274 Kublai sent an invasion fleet across Tsushima Strait to Tsushima Island, comprising over 900 ships and 20,000 soldiers.  This, the first invasion, overran Tsushima and Iki.  From there they sailed to Hakata Bay, which resulted in the Battle of Bun'ei, where what the Japanese were later to call a kamikaze ("divine wind") wrecked the invading forces in their ships.

The second attempted invasion came after more envoys had been sent in 1275 and 1279.  At that time, the Japanese beheaded them rather than simply refusing them.  As a consequence, Kublai dispatched another invasion fleet, consisting the Song fleet, which the Empire captured in 1275, and a further 1,000 ships supplied by Goryeo.  The latter arrived in Japan in May 1281 before the Song fleet, and attacked Hakata without waiting for the Song ships, and also without success.  Thus began the Battle of Kōan.  The Song fleet arrived later, and also attacked Hakata, but were unable to overcome Japanese forces.  Eventually, on the 15th of August, another kamikaze wrecked the invading forces in their ships.

Twentieth century

Before World War II
After the collapse of the Qing Dynasty that had ruled Mongolia for some centuries and the Outer Mongolian revolution of 1911 (for more of the history, see History of Mongolia.) and after the rise of Japan to world power status in the early 20th century, the Mongolian government of Bogd Khan sent emissaries requesting formal diplomatic recognition to various world powers, including the Internal Affairs Minister, Da Lam Tserenchimed, who was sent to Japan in 1913.

Since World War II
After World War II, diplomatic relations between Japan and Mongolia only resumed on 24 February 1972. This was done following the invitation and attendance of Mongolia to the Expo '70, held in Osaka, which revealed a strong desire to normalise relations on both sides. Following this, the Central Committee of the Mongolian People's Revolutionary Party voted against raising the issue of war reparations with Japan, thus leading to an exchange of diplomats and restoring of formal relations. On 17 March 1977, the two nations signed an agreement on economic co-operation. This agreement gave Mongolia an investment of  into cashmere production. By 1988, trade between Mongolia and Japan was worth , equivalent to 43% of all Mongolian trade with capitalist nations.

Relations improved following 1990 Democratic Revolution in Mongolia, whereupon Sousuke Uno's visit in April 1989 and Toshiki Kaifu's visit to Mongolia in August 1991, following the visit by Dumaagiin Sodnom to Japan in March 1990, became the first visits to Mongolia by a non-Eastern Bloc minister and prime minister, respectively.

More recently Japan and Mongolia have been seeking relationship improvements. In 2008, the Japan Bank for International Cooperation financed a  loan for the government of Mongolia to build a new international airport in Töv Province to service Ulan Bator (currently serviced by Buyant-Ukhaa International Airport). Construction lasted between 2012 and 2017.

Almost 40% of Mongolians regard Japan as a more important foreign partner than China.

See also

Mongolians in Japan
Mongolia in World War II

References

Cross-reference

Reference bibliography

 
Mongolia
Bilateral relations of Mongolia